Ann O'Neil Baskins (born August 5, 1955 in Red Bluff, California, USA) is former General Counsel for Hewlett-Packard Company (HP). Baskins was linked to the HP pretexting scandal. On September 28, 2006, following public disclosure of the matter, Baskins resigned effective immediately, hours before she was to appear as a witness before the House Committee on Energy and Commerce at which she would later invoke the Fifth Amendment to "not be held to answer for a capital, or otherwise infamous crime." Baskins was never charged by California or federal authorities.

She was a contestant on Tic Tac Dough in the Spring 1980 but lost to all-time Tic Tac Dough champion Thom McKee. Baskins was succeeded by Charles Charnas, a member of her team, who became HP Acting General Counsel. On February 8, 2007, HP CEO Mark Hurd appointed Michael Holston as HP Executive Vice President and General Counsel, effective February 22, 2007.

Career 

 Crosby, Heafey, Roach & May (now Reed Smith Crosby Heafey), 1980 to 1981
 Associate
 Hewlett-Packard Company, 1982 to September 28, 2006
 Attorney, 1982
 Senior Attorney, 1985
 Assistant Secretary, 1985
 Corporate Counsel, 1986
 Corporate Secretary, 1999 to 2006
 Vice President, November 1999 to 2002
 General Counsel (company's top lawyer), January 2000 to 2006
 Senior Vice President, 2002 to 2006

Bar admissions 
 State Bar of California, December 16, 1980

Other memberships 
 American Bar Association
 American Corporate Counsel Association
 American Society of Corporate Secretaries
 Silicon Valley Association of General Counsels (SVAGC)

Education 
 B.A., History, Stanford University, Stanford, California, USA, 1977
 J.D., UCLA School of Law, Los Angeles, California, USA, 1980

Awards 
 California Law Business, #1 attorney in annual list of California's top 50 counsel, 2001

Personal 
 Husband is Thomas C. DeFilipps, partner in law firm Wilson Sonsini Goodrich & Rosati

References 

1955 births
California lawyers
Hewlett-Packard people
Living people
Stanford University alumni
UCLA School of Law alumni
American women business executives
American women lawyers
People from Red Bluff, California
21st-century American women